Suhadol is a small dispersed settlement in the hills west of Loče in the Municipality of Slovenske Konjice in eastern Slovenia. The municipality is included in the Savinja Statistical Region and is part of the traditional region of Styria.

References

External links
Suhadol at Geopedia

Populated places in the Municipality of Slovenske Konjice